The 1926 Akron Zippers football team was an American football team that represented the University of Akron in the Ohio Athletic Conference (OAC) during the 1926 college football season. In its first and only season under head coach George Babcock, the team compiled a 5–2–2 record (4–2–2 against conference opponents) and outscored opponents by a total of 109 to 74. Frank Wargo was the team captain.

Schedule

References

Akron
Akron Zips football seasons
Akron football